Chester D. Davidson (1826–1870) was a Minnesota politician and Speaker of the Minnesota House of Representatives, representing Minneapolis. He was first served in the Minnesota House of Representatives in 1868, and was elected speaker one year later, serving in the position for his sole remaining year in the House.

References

1826 births
1870 deaths
Republican Party members of the Minnesota House of Representatives
Speakers of the Minnesota House of Representatives
19th-century American politicians